The Angle Orthodontist is a bimonthly peer-reviewed medical journal covering orthodontics that is published by the E. H. Angle Education and Research Foundation and is the official journal of the Edward H. Angle Society of Orthodontia. The editor-in-chief is Steven J. Lindauer (Virginia Commonwealth University). According to the Journal Citation Reports, the journal has a 2014 impact factor of 1.225.

History 
The journal was first formed in 1930 where Mrs. Angle became the first Editor-in-Chief and Dr. Frank A. Gough was the first Business Manager. The society was formed by the members of the Edward H. Angle Society of Orthodontia at their meeting in Chicago in 1930. Dr. Allan G. Brodie presented the first scientific paper of this journal. For the first 17 years, this was the only journal devoted strictly to orthodontia because  American Journal of Orthodontics and Dentofacial Orthopedics journal was formerly known as American Journal of Orthodontia and Oral Surgery until 1948.

Editor-in-Chief: Past and Present

 Robert H. W. Strang, 1930 - 1936 
 Dean Harold Noyes 1936 - 1947 
 Wendell L. Wylie, 1947 - 1952 
 Arthur B. Lewis, Morse Newcomb 1952 - 1980 
 Raymond C. Thurow, 1981 - 1988 
 David L. Turpin, 1989 - 1999 
 Robert J. Isaacson, 2000 – 2012 
 Steven J. Lindauer 2012–Present

References

External links
 

Dentistry journals
English-language journals
Bimonthly journals
Publications established in 1931
Open access journals
Academic journals published by learned and professional societies
Orthodontics
Allen Press academic journals